Dick Cruikshanks was an actor and director in South Africa born in 1874 and died on March 3, 1947.

His work includes five short comedies filmed in 1917, three of them with African actors.

Partial filmography

Actor
De Voortrekkers (1916) as Piet Retief
Swallow (1918) as Jan Botmar

Director
The Major's Dilemma (1917)
The Mealie Kids (1917)
The Piccanini's Christmas (1917)
Zulu-Town-Comedies (1917)
Bond and Word (1918)
The Bridge (1918)
Fallen Leaves (1919)
Prester John (1920)
The Vulture's Prey (1921) 
The Blue Lagoon (1923)

References

South African male film actors
South African film directors